Raheel Majeed (born 9 September 1983) is a Pakistani first-class cricketer who played for Islamabad.

References

External links
 

1983 births
Living people
Pakistani cricketers
Islamabad cricketers
Cricketers from Islamabad
Islamabad Leopards cricketers